The Doryctinae or doryctine wasps are a large subfamily of braconid parasitic wasps (Braconidae).  Numerous genera and species formerly unknown to science are being described every year. This subfamily is presumably part of a clade containing otherwise any or all of the Alysiinae, Braconinae, Gnamptodontinae, Opiinae and Ypsistocerinae, and might be most closely related to the last one of these. Whether the Rogadinae are also part of this group is not known.

Description and distribution
Doryctine wasps are found across almost the entire size range of Braconidae, from 1 to 25 mm. In the small species the head tends to be relatively large and the body, while slender, remarkably elongated. Doryctines tend to be small-winged, with many having very much reduced wings. Numerous species in this family are unable to fly or even lack wings entirely. They have a characteristic row of stout spines running lengthwise along the foreleg tibia, and a cyclostome depression above the mandibles.

Doryctinae have a worldwide distribution (except the polar regions).

Biology 
Some Doryctinae are known to form galls on plants similar to the Mesostoinae (a small subfamily endemic to Australia). Some species in the genus Allorhogas feed on seeds. The large majority of doryctines are idobiont ectoparasitoids of the larvae of wood-boring beetles – such as jewel beetles (Buprestidae). Some species parasitize lepidopteran or symphytan larvae. The host is paralyzed by venom injected through the female's ovipositor before an egg is laid. The spines present on the foreleg of the adult enable it to escape from the narrow wooden tunnels of the hosts.

Biological control 
Doryctines have been used to control pests in Europe, Australia, and North America. Several doryctine wasps are of economic importance as biocontrol agents in Australia against eucalyptus pests. The species Spathius agrili has been introduced to the United States from China in an effort to control the Emerald ash borer.

Selected genera
Genera placed in the Doryctinae include:

 Acanthodoryctes Turner, 1918
 Achterbergia Marsh, 1993
 Afrospathius Belokobylskij & Quicke, 2000
 Aivalykus Nixon, 1938 
 Allorhogas Gahan, 1912
 Amazondoryctes Barbalho & Penteado-Dias, 1999
 Antidoryctes Belokobylskij & Quicke, 2000
 Aptenobracon Marsh, 1965
 Arhaconotus Belokobylskij, 2001
 Asiaheterospilus Belokobylskij & Konishi, 2001
 Asiaontsira Belokobylskij, Tang, & Chen, 2013
 Australospathius Belokobylskij, Iqbal & Austin, 2004
 Barbalhoa Marsh, 2002
 Binarea Brullé, 1846
 Bolivar Zaldívar-Riverón & Rodríguez-Jiménez, 2013
 Bracodoryctes Belokobylskij & Quicke, 2000
 Caenopachyella Szépligeti, 1908
 Caenopachys Foerster, 1862  
 Caenophanes Foerster, 1862 
 Chelonodoryctes Belokobylskij & Quicke, 2000
 Cryptodoryctes Belokobylskij & Quicke, 2000
 Cyphodoryctes Marsh, 1993
 Dendrosoter Wesmael, 1838
 Dendrosotinus Telenga, 1941
 Doryctes Haliday, 1836
 Doryctinus Roman, 1910 (synonym:  Acrophasmus)
 Doryctopambolus Nunes, et al., 2012
 Doryctophasmus Enderlein, 1912
 Doryctopsis Belokobylskij, Iqbal & Austin, 2004
 Ecphylopsis Ashmead, 1900
 Ecphylus Foerster, 1862
 Euhecabolodes Tobias, 1962
 Euscelinus Westwood, 1882
 Evaniodes Szépligeti, 1901
 Gildoria Hedqvist, 1974
 Glyptocolastes Ashmead, 1900
 Hecabolus Curtis, 1834
 Halycaea Cameron, 1903
 Heerz Marsh, 1993
 Hemidoryctes Belokobylskij, 1993 (= Atopodoryctes)
 Hemispathius Belokobylskij & Quicke, 2000
 Heterospilus Haliday, 1836
 Hypodoryctes Kokujev, 1900
 Iare Barbalho & Penteado-Dias, 2000
 Ipodoryctes Granger, 1949
 Ivondrovia Shenefelt & Marsh, 1976
 Jarra Marsh & Austin, 1994
 Johnsonius Marsh, 1993
 Kauriphanes Belokobylskij, Ceccarelli, Zaldívar-Riverón, 2012
 Leluthia Cameron, 1887
 Leptospathius Szépligeti, 1902
 Lianus Gomes & Penteado-Dias, 2006
 Liobracon Szépligeti, 1901
 Liodoryctes Szépligeti, 1906
 Lissopsius Marsh, 2002
 Megaloproctus Schulz, 1906
 Metaspathius Brues, 1922
 Mexiare Belokobylskij, Samaca-Sáenz, & Zaldívar-Riverón, 2015
 Mimodoryctes Zaldívar-Riverón & Rodríguez-Jiménez, 2013
 Monarea Szépligeti, 1904
 Monolexis Foerster, 1862
 Mononeuron Fischer, 1981
 Neoheterospilus Belokobylskij, 2006
 Neurocrassis Šnoflák, 1945
 Nipponecphylus Belokobylskij, 2001
 Ontsira Cameron, 1900
 Oroceguera Seltmann & Sharkey, 2007
 Pambolidea Ashmead, 1900
 Parallorhogas Marsh, 1993
 Paraspathius Viereck, 1911
 Percnobracon Kieffer & Jörgensen, 1910
 Platyspathius Viereck, 1911
 Polystenus Foerster, 1862
 Psenobolus Reinhard, 1885
 Pseudorhaconotus van Achterberg, 2009
 Pseudosyngaster Belokobylskij, Iqbal & Austin, 2004
 Rasnitsynoryctes Belokobylskij, 2011
 Rhaconotus Ruthe, 1854
 Rhoptrocentrus Marshall, 1897
 Ryukyuspathius Belokobylskij, 2008
 Schlettereriella Szépligeti, 1904
 Sergey Martinez, Lazaro, Pedraza-Lara, & Zaldivar-Riveron, 2016 
 Sonanus Belokobylskij & Konishi, 2001
 Spathiomorpha Tobias, 1976
 Spathiostenus Belokobylskij, 1993
 Spathius Nees, 1818 
 Stenocorse Marsh, 1968
 Stephanospathius Belokobylskij, 1992
 Syngaster Brullé, 1846
 Synspilus Belokobylskij & Quicke, 2000
 Tripteria Enderlein, 1912
 Tuberatra Gadelha, Nunes, & de Oliveira, 2016
 Venifurca Gadelha, Nunes, Zaldivar-Riveron, & de Oliveira, 2016
 Wachsmannia Szépligeti, 1900
 Whitfieldiellus Marsh, 1997
 Zombrus Marshall, 1897

References

External links 
 Photos on BugGuide
 DNA barcodes on BOLD Systems

Braconidae
Apocrita subfamilies